Jeff Wayne Nygaard (born August 3, 1972, in Madison, Wisconsin) is an American volleyball and beach volleyball player who participated in the 2004 Summer Olympics with partner Dain Blanton in Athens, Greece. In 1996 and 2000 he was a member of the Men's Olympic National Indoor Team. He is a middle blocker.

He attended La Follette High School in Madison, Wisconsin, where he played volleyball under coach Randy Ramig.  Nicknamed "Little Ny" because his older, and then larger, brother Brad also played on the volleyball team, Nygaard improved quickly to become a key and then a star player. The La Follette High School volleyball team won state championships in 1987 and 1989 and came in second in 1988.

In 1989 and 1990, he played for the Wisconsin Select volleyball club.

He was named college player of the year in 1994 and 1995.

Nygaard was an assistant coach for the Whittier College women's volleyball team in 2009.

Currently Nygaard is active as a featured professional on the volleyball website Volleyball 1on1, where he produces instructional volleyball videos featuring himself and other well-known volleyball professionals.

He is the head coach of the USC Trojans men's volleyball team.

References

 Profile at The Washington Post

External links
 Jeff Nygaard volleyball videos

1972 births
Living people
American men's volleyball players
American men's beach volleyball players
Volleyball players at the 1996 Summer Olympics
Volleyball players at the 2000 Summer Olympics
Beach volleyball players at the 2004 Summer Olympics
Olympic beach volleyball players of the United States
Olympic volleyball players of the United States
Panathinaikos V.C. players
Sportspeople from Madison, Wisconsin
Whittier College people
UCLA Bruins men's volleyball players
USC Trojans men's volleyball coaches